Cladosporium psychrotolerans is a fungus found in hypersaline environments. It grows well at 4 °C but not at 30 °C, and has ornamented, globoid conidia with long digitate projections.

References

Cladosporium
Fungi described in 2007